Huangbeiling station is a station on Line 2 and Line 5 of the Shenzhen Metro in  Shenzhen, Guangdong, China. Line 2 platforms opened on 28 June 2011 and Line 5 platforms opened on 22 June 2011.

Station layout

Exits

References

Shenzhen Metro stations
Railway stations in Guangdong
Luohu District
Railway stations in China opened in 2011